Vexel is a neologism for an entirely pixel-based form of raster art that imitates the visual appearance of vector graphics technique (i.e. sharp-edged lines and areas of flat colour or smooth gradient fills). The word itself is a portmanteau derived from a combination of "vector" and "pixel."

Technique 

There is no one defined way to create a vexel, however, one archetypal way to create a vexel follows. Instead of using vector-based lines, shapes, and polygons to create an image, a vexel is typically created using a raster program's support for transparent layers. Each transparent layer is given a solid (or sometimes gradient) shape and a display ordering that when displayed together with other near shape layers appears to create a stepped-but-gradual color transition. In some cases, for more realism, gradients are used to remove the stepping in the color transitions to create a smoother, photo-realistic image.

The different nature of raster programs over a vector-plotted approach gives some vexel images a unique appearance when compared with traditional rasterized vector graphics. However, the increased flexibility comes with a loss of image scalability for print media, which vector artwork retains. To compensate for this, most vexels are created at very high resolution.

A vexel may even be composed using vector graphic techniques, however it becomes a vexel when the vector elements are rasterized and further manipulations to the image are done in raster. Sometimes true raster images are placed behind and/or in front of the original vector elements to emphasize the surrealism that the vector elements produce. A vexel is not essentially created with paintbrushes, airbrushes or a freehand tool such as pencil, although some may include these elements if they are not the primary medium. Ben Woolley says "[V]exels were originally meant to involve a vector technique, not any particular aesthetic style."

Style and appearance 

Vexels are often characterized by crisp, clean color and lines (that look nearly vector-graphics style) but is entirely pixel-based, with a variety of color levels, from 2-color outlines to pseudo-realism.

Etymology 
The term vexel was created by Seth Woolley while he was a technical contributor to the now defunct but once popular teen message board Nova Boards to give it a distinctive name from traditional vector graphics. Seth didn't approve of calling the raster images that looked like vectors the name of "vector".  In response to a question of what they would be called, he coined the term "vexel" as a combination of vector and pixel since they were not simply rasters, and those asking needed a name for a new style. He at first suggested calling them rasterized or posterized vector images, but the community took the word "vexel" as an acceptable neologism. Ben Woolley has described its derivation.

References and notes

Vector graphics
Computer graphic techniques
Technology neologisms